On May 25, 2020, Dion Johnson, a 28-year-old Black man, was killed in Phoenix, Arizona, United States, . According to the Phoenix Police, a trooper was patrolling when he discovered Johnson's vehicle parked in the gore point near Loop 101 and Tatum Boulevard. The trooper approached the vehicle and found Johnson asleep at the drivers seat, with cans of beer and a gun in the car, after removing the gun, the trooper attempted to arrest Johnson.

According to the trooper, an altercation occurred when Johnson woke up and grabbed at him, the trooper drew his weapon and ordered Johnson to comply with instructions, Johnson complied and then as the trooper holstered his weapon, Johnson  lunged for the weapon. Another altercation ensued in the struggle, resulting in the trooper allegedly firing his weapon twice, with one bullet fatally striking Johnson. Johnson later died at the hospital. Police stated there was neither body camera nor car camera footage, and the trooper was not wearing a body camera. However, significant evidence, including several eyewitnesses, have corroborated what Trooper Cervantes said happened

People involved 
Dion Johnson was a prohibited possessor of firearms due to past criminal charges and had recently been released from the Arizona Department of Corrections several months prior. He had spent time in prison for armed robbery and aggravated assault, was listed as a known gang member, and also had complaints about fights with family and an ex-girlfriend.

George Cervantes is a Public Safety Trooper who was identified as the trooper involved in the shooting, and a fifteen-year veteran of the force. He had been disciplined for some complaints in the past, such as using his police taser on his family's dog.

Incident 

According to the Phoenix Police account, a trooper was patrolling when he discovered Johnson's vehicle parked at the triangle piece of land between the freeway and on/off ramp, near Loop 101 and Tatum Boulevard. The trooper approached the vehicle and found Johnson asleep at the drivers seat, with cans of beer and a gun in the car, after removing the gun the trooper returned to his motor unit to wait for a backup officer. Trooper Cervantes then noticed Johnson begin to move around in the vehicle. Fearing Johnson would attempt to drive off and endanger the public, he attempted to arrest him. An altercation occurred when Johnson woke up and grabbed at Trooper Cervantes, who drew his firearm to force Johnson to comply. Johnson initially complied so Trooper Cervantes holstered his weapon. At this time Johnson lunged forward and grabbed a hold of Trooper Cervante's vest. Fearing he would be pushed into oncoming traffic, Trooper Cervantes drew his weapon and fired two shots, striking Johnson once. Trooper Cervantes removed Johnson from the vehicle and placed him into handcuffs, per proper procedure while waiting for backup to arrive to provide traffic control for emergency vehicles staging nearby,

Investigation 
Officials have placed the trooper who shot Johnson on paid administrative leave. The trooper was never charged with any foul play.  The department also stated there is no dashcam video as both troopers involved were motorcycle officers and were not equipped with body cameras. However, video footage was later released from a live-feed Arizona Department of Transportation camera that was recorded by a local news station after the incident took place. The trooper was never charged or found to be at fault for protecting his life. The internal investigation by the Arizona Department of Public Safety was completed in April 2021, and concluded that there were no issues or deficiencies in the incident.

Aftermath 
The Arizona Department of Public Safety erected fencing around its headquarters in Phoenix in late May 2020 in order to stop a vigil for Johnson on the grounds. The fencing has since been turned into a community mural of posters, cardboard and paper signs that were fixed to the fencing with string and tape.

Johnson's death was protested by Black Lives Matter protestors along with the murder of George Floyd. On June 7, protestors had held 11 days of daily marches in Phoenix to demand change and chanted for six minutes straight to highlight the time that medical aid was withheld from Johnson even with an ambulance stationed a few hundred feet away.

Response 
The family of Johnson and their attorney Jocquese Blackwell, have questioned how a man who was sleeping in his vehicle and disarmed could end up being killed, emphasizing the lack of body cameras, police cameras, or other witnesses to corroborate the sole police account of the incident.

Arizona State Representative Reginald Bolding, has demanded more transparency in the case and sent a letter to the public safety department. He later issued a statement to the US Department of Justice to take over the investigation, that was cosigned by Representative Doctor Geraldine Peten and Arizona Commissioner Sandra Kennedy.

References 

2020 deaths
2020 controversies in the United States
2020 in Arizona
African-American-related controversies
Black Lives Matter
Deaths by person in Arizona
African Americans shot dead by law enforcement officers in the United States
May 2020 events in the United States
Protests in the United States
Law enforcement controversies in the United States
Phoenix Police Department